Avens may refer to:

Flowering plants 
 The genus Dryas 
 The genus Geum

People 
 Robert Avens, author, notably of a book about Henry Corbin
Pjotrs Avens, Latvian name of Petr Aven, Russian businessman and politician of Latvian descent

Other 
 The Avens bridge across South Holston Lake in Virginia, U.S.A
 Avens B.V., a defunct company associated with Landsbank Íslandsi
 Audio-Visual Education in Neurosurgery (AVENS) was a multimedia journal for neurosurgeons

See also 
 Aven (disambiguation)